Raymore is a city in Cass County, Missouri, United States, within the Kansas City Metropolitan Area. Raymore is one of the fastest-growing cities in the state of Missouri.  The population was 21,676 at the 2020 census.

History
Raymore was platted in 1874. The name Raymore is an amalgamation of the surnames of two railroad men, Ray and Moore. A post office called Raymore has been in operation since 1872.

The Watkins Family Farm Historic District was listed on the National Register of Historic Places in 2007.

Government
The City of Raymore follows a City Council-Manager style of government. The mayor is Kristofer P. Turnbow. On September 9, 2014, Jim Feuerborn was administered his oath of office to serve as Raymore's City Manager (after previously serving as the City's Acting City Manager since June, and the City's Assistant City Manager prior to that). The Raymore City Hall is located at 100 Municipal Circle, just south of Missouri Route 58.

Geography

Demographics

2010 census
As of the census of 2010, there were 19,206 people and 7,001 households residing in the city. The population density was 1115.0 people per square mile (384.4/km2). There were 7,421 housing units at an average density of 418.1 per square mile (384.4/km2). The racial makeup of the city was 87.8% White, 7.8% African American, 0.8% Asian, and 0.4% Native American. Hispanic or Latino of any race were 3.2% of the population.

According to the U.S. Census Bureau's latest data for incorporated cities in Missouri, Raymore's estimated population, as of July 1, 2013, is 19,754 residents.

There were 7,001 households, of which 37.9% had children under the age of 18 living with them, 62.6% were married couples living together, 9.9% had a female householder with no husband present, and 24.2% were non-families. 21.1% of all households were made up of individuals, and 10.0% had someone living alone who was 65 years of age or older. The average household size was 2.72 and the average family size was 3.10.

In the city, the population was spread out, with 30.8% under the age of 20, 4.1% from 20 to 24, 27.6% from 25 to 44, 23.8% from 45 to 64, and 13.7% who were 65 years of age or older. The median age was 36.5 years. Females comprised 52.1% of the population.

The median income for a household in the city was $74,597, according to the City's Economic Development department.

Economy

Largest employers
According to the City's 2015 Comprehensive Annual Financial Report, the largest employers in the city are:

Education
Public education in Raymore is administered by Raymore-Peculiar R-II School District.

References

External links
City of Raymore
Stonegate of the Good Ranch HOA
Silver Lake Homes Association
Creekmoor, a Cooper Community

 
Cities in Cass County, Missouri
Populated places established in 1874
1874 establishments in Missouri
Cities in Missouri